This is a list of the moths of family Nolidae that are found in Canada. It also acts as an index to the species articles and forms part of the full List of moths of Canada.

Following the species name, there is an abbreviation that indicates the Canadian provinces or territories in which the species can be found.

Western Canada
BC = British Columbia
AB = Alberta
SK = Saskatchewan
MB = Manitoba
YT = Yukon
NT = Northwest Territories
NT = Nunavut

Eastern Canada
ON = Ontario
QC = Quebec
NB = New Brunswick
NS = Nova Scotia
PE = Prince Edward Island
NF = Newfoundland
LB = Labrador

Subfamily Chloephorinae
Characoma nilotica (Rogenhofer, 1881)-ON, QC, NS
Nycteola cinereana Neumoegen & Dyar, 1893-BC, AB, MB, ON, QC, NF
Nycteola columbiana (Edwards, 1873)-BC
Nycteola frigidana (Walker, 1863)-BC, AB, MB, NT, ON, QC, NB, NS, NF
Nycteola metaspilella (Walker, 1866)-ON

Subfamily Nolinae
Meganola minuscula (Zeller, 1872)-BC, SK, MB, ON, QC, NB, NS
Meganola spodia Franclemont, 1985-ON, QC
Nola cilicoides (Grote, 1873)-AB, SK, MB, ON, QC, NB, NS
Nola ovilla Grote, 1875-ON, QC
Nola minna Butler, 1881-BC
Nola triquetrana (Fitch, 1856)-ON, QC, NS

Subfamily Risobinae
Baileya australis (Grote, 1881)-ON, QC
Baileya dormitans (Guenée, 1852)-ON, QC
Baileya doubledayi (Guenée, 1852)-SK, MB, ON, QC, NB, NS
Baileya levitans (Smith, 1906)-ON, QC
Baileya ophthalmica (Guenée, 1852)-AB, SK, MB, ON, QC, NB, NS

External links
Moths of Canada at the Canadian Biodiversity Information Facility

Canada